Little Church Around the Corner is a 1923 American drama film directed by William A. Seiter and written by Olga Printzlau. The film stars Claire Windsor, Kenneth Harlan, Hobart Bosworth, Pauline Starke, Walter Long, and Cyril Chadwick. The film was released by Warner Bros. in March 1923.

Cast    
Claire Windsor as Leila Morton
Kenneth Harlan as David Graham
Hobart Bosworth as John Morton
Pauline Starke as Hetty Burrows
Walter Long as Big Hex Poulon
Cyril Chadwick as Mark Hanford
Alec B. Francis as Reverend Bradley 
Winter Hall as Doc
Margaret Seddon as Mrs. Wallace
George Cooper as Jude Burrows
Stanton Heck as Burt Wilson
Fred R. Stanton as The Sheriff 
Winston Miller as Little David 
Mary Jane Irving as Little Hetty

Box office
According to Warner Bros records the film earned $324,000 domestically and $28,000 foreign.

References

External links

1923 films
1920s English-language films
Silent American drama films
1923 drama films
Warner Bros. films
Films directed by William A. Seiter
American silent feature films
American black-and-white films
1920s American films